Loick Denis Henry Ayina (born 20 April 2003) is a Congolese professional footballer who plays as a defender for Dundee United, on loan from Huddersfield Town.

Career
Born in the Republic of the Congo capital Brazzaville, he moved to Paris, France as a youngster, Diarra started his football career playing for local Parisian club Montrouge F.C. 92, before moving to Athletic Club de Boulogne-Billancourt.

Alongside fellow Frenchman Brahima Diarra, he moved to Huddersfield Town in July 2019, and they both signed professional contracts with the club a year later.

In October 2021, Ayina joined National League North side Boston United on a one-month loan.

Ayina made his senior debut for Huddersfield Town on 7 January 2023, when he played in their 3–1 FA Cup defeat against Preston North End, where he received an early yellow card, and was substituted before half-time, for fear of a second yellow card.

On 31 January 2023, Ayina joined Dundee United on loan until the end of the 2022–23 season. He was sent off on his debut, against Kilmarnock in the Scottish Cup.

References

2003 births
Living people
Footballers from Paris
Republic of the Congo footballers
Huddersfield Town A.F.C. players
Boston United F.C. players
Association football midfielders
English Football League players
Expatriate footballers in England
Sportspeople from Brazzaville
Dundee United F.C. players
Expatriate footballers in Scotland